Qualification for the 2003 Little League World Series took place in sixteen different parts of the world during July and August 2003, with formats and number of teams varying by region.

United States

Great Lakes

The tournament took place in Indianapolis, Indiana from August 1–10.

Mid-Atlantic Region

The tournament took place in Bristol, Connecticut from August 2–12.

Midwest

The tournament took place in Indianapolis, Indiana from August 1–10.

New England

The tournament was held in Bristol, Connecticut from August 2–11.

Northwest

The tournament was held in San Bernardino, California from August 2–11.

Southeast

The tournament took place in St. Petersburg, Florida from August 3–9.

Southwest

The tournament took place in Waco, Texas from August 4–10.

West

The tournament took place in San Bernardino from August 1–12.

International

Asia

The tournament took place in Rota, Northern Mariana Islands from July 28–August 1.

Canada

The tournament was held in Sydney, Nova Scotia from August 2–9.

Caribbean

The tournament took place in Mayaguez, Puerto Rico from July 20–26.

Europe, Middle East and Africa

The tournament took place in Kutno, Poland from July 15–22.

Latin America

The tournament took place in Mayaguez, Puerto Rico from July 20–26.

Mexico

The tournament took place in Hermosillo, Sonora from July 3–12.

Phase 1

Phase 2

Pacific

The tournament took place in Rota, Northern Mariana Islands from July 28–August 1.

Transatlantic

The tournament was held in Kutno, Poland from July 15–23.

External links
2003 Little League World Series website 

Little League World Series
2003 in softball